Derek Barach (born February 27, 1995) is an American ice hockey player who currently plays for Porin Ässät of the Liiga. He plays as a centre.

Early career 
Derek began his ice hockey career as a young child playing for the CD Selects, a junior A team in Albany New York. He played High School Hockey for the Bethlehem Central High School Eagles, The Albany Academy Cadets, and the Salisbury School Crimson Knights .

Career 
He played his first Liiga game on October 10, 2021. On October 15 Barach scored his first Liiga goal with a hat trick in a game against KalPa, overall he scored 4 goals in that game.

References 

Living people
1995 births
American ice hockey centers
Mercyhurst Lakers men's ice hockey players
Green Bay Gamblers players
Cleveland Monsters players
Jacksonville Icemen players
Indy Fuel players
Texas Stars players
Ässät players
American expatriate ice hockey players in Finland
People from Bethlehem, New York
Ice hockey players from New York (state)